Eagle Point is a city in Jackson County, Oregon, United States. The population was 8,469 at the 2010 census, up from 4,798 at the 2000 census. As of 2018, the estimated population was 9,408.

History
In the mid-19th century, a rocky cliff near the location of what later became Eagle Point was a favored nesting place for eagles. An area resident, John Mathews, is said to have suggested "Eagle Point" as the name for a proposed post office in the community. The post office was established in 1872; Andrew McNeil was the first postmaster.

A water-powered gristmill, Butte Creek Mill, has operated in Eagle Point for more than 125 years. Built in 1872 along Little Butte Creek, it was added to the National Register of Historic Places in 1976. The mill burned to the ground Christmas Day 2015. The Butte Creek Mill has been rebuilt, with the first batch of grain being sold in December 2020. On May 15, 2016, Actor Jim Belushi performed at an outdoor benefit concert for the Butte Creek Mill. In 2018, Actor Patrick Duffy, a longtime Eagle Point resident signed on as the Advisory Director for the Butte Creek Mill Foundation in an effort to rebuild the Butte Creek Mill. He joins actor Jim Belushi who has been a supporter since the mill burned.

 	
In 2018 Eagle Point Police Department Officer Daniel Cardenas shot and killed Matthew Graves. According to attorneys Kelly L. Anderson and David Linthorst, the “arrest” of Graves on mere suspicion alone is not grounds to detain him. “After making an unlawful arrest,” attorneys said, “Cardenas compounded the problem by using excessive force. In doing so, Cardenas himself created the very crisis for which he later claimed to have needed to use deadly force.”. Cardenas also made multiple discrepancies during his Grand Jury testimony which went against his protest of innocence. The City had to pay 4.5 Million Dollars for wrongful death.

Geography

The city is north of Medford and White City and south of Shady Cove in the Rogue River Valley along Oregon Route 62. Little Butte Creek, a tributary of the Rogue River, passes through Eagle Point and enters the larger stream a few miles to the west near TouVelle State Recreation Site and Upper and Lower Table Rock.

Climate
This region experiences warm (but not hot) and dry summers, with no average monthly temperatures above . According to the Köppen Climate Classification system, Eagle Point has a warm-summer Mediterranean climate, abbreviated "Csb" on climate maps.

Demographics

2010 census
At the 2010 census, there were 8,469 people, 3,231 households, and 2,373 families living in the city. The racial makeup of the city was 92.1% White, 0.2% African American, 1.3% Native American, 1.0% Asian, 0.1% Pacific Islander, 1.7% from other races, and 3.6% from two or more races. Hispanic or Latino of any race were 6.8% of the population.

Of the 3,231 households 37.5% had children under the age of 18 living with them, 55.9% were married couples living together, 12.0% had a female householder with no husband present, 5.5% had a male householder with no wife present, and 26.6% were non-families. 20.9% of households were one person and 9.7% were one person aged 65 or older. The average household size was 2.62 and the average family size was 3.01.

The median age was 36.9 years. 27.3% of residents were under the age of 18; 6.7% were between the ages of 18 and 24; 26.2% were from 25 to 44; 25.5% were from 45 to 64; and 14.2% were 65 or older. The gender makeup of the city was 48.1% male and 51.9% female.

2000 census
At the 2000 census, there were 4,797 people, 1,703 households, and 1,313 families living in the city. The population density was 1,869.9 people per square mile (720.7/km). There were 1,823 housing units at an average density of 710.6 per square mile (273.9/km). The racial makeup of the city was 93.16% White, 0.38% African American, 1.73% Native American, 0.40% Asian, 0.19% Pacific Islander, 1.10% from other races, and 3.04% from two or more races. Hispanic or Latino of any race were 3.52% of the population.

Of the 1,703 households 45.6% had children under the age of 18 living with them, 56.9% were married couples living together, 14.6% had a female householder with no husband present, and 22.9% were non-families. 18.1% of households were one person and 8.1% were one person aged 65 or older. The average household size was 2.82 and the average family size was 3.17. In the city, the population was 32.6% under the age of 18, 9.4% from 18 to 24, 29.2% from 25 to 44, 19.7% from 45 to 64, and 9.1% 65 or older. The median age was 30 years. For every 100 females, there were 93.2 males. For every 100 females age 18 and over, there were 89.7 males. The median household income was $37,557 and the median family income was $40,598. Males had a median income of $30,795 versus $20,956 for females. The per capita income for the city was $15,501. About 11.4% of families and 12.8% of the population were below the poverty line, including 18.7% of those under age 18 and 15.1% of those age 65 or over.

Notable people

Jim Belushi, television actor, comedian and singer, starred on Saturday Night Live and According to Jim
Patrick Duffy, television actor, starred in Dallas
Tyrone Holmes, American football player. 
Larry Lansburgh (1911–2001), American producer, director, and screenwriter
Kim Novak, actress, starred in Vertigo and Picnic
Nathan Pine, current Director of Athletics at the United States Air Force Academy
Matt Ross, screenwriter, actor, and director known for roles in Big Love and Silicon Valley

See also
 Denman Wildlife Area, near Eagle Point
 Eagle Point National Cemetery

References

External links
City of Eagle Point official website
Entry for Eagle Point in the Oregon Blue Book

 
Cities in Oregon
Cities in Jackson County, Oregon
1911 establishments in Oregon
Populated places established in 1911